A one-party state, single-party state, one-party system or single-party system is a sovereign state in which only one political party has the right to form the government, usually based on the existing constitution. All other parties are either outlawed or only enjoy limited and controlled participation in elections. Sometimes the term "de facto one-party state" is used to describe a dominant-party system that, unlike the one-party state, allows (at least nominally) democratic multiparty elections, but the existing practices or balance of political power effectively prevent the opposition from winning power.

Although it is predated by the 1714 to 1783 "age of the Whig oligarchy" in Great Britain, the rule of the Committee of Union and Progress (CUP) over the Ottoman Empire following the 1913 coup d'état is often considered the first one-party state.

Current one-party states
As of  the following countries are legally constituted as one-party states:

Concept

One-party states justify themselves through various methods. Most often, proponents of a one-party state argue that the existence of separate parties runs counter to national unity. Others argue that the one party is the vanguard of the people, being its most politically aware members, and therefore the party's right to rule cannot be legitimately questioned. The Soviet government argued that the existence of multiple political parties would perpetuate class struggle, so only a single party could lead a classless proletariat; it therefore made the Communist Party of the Soviet Union the only authorised political party.

Some one-party states only outlaw opposition parties, while allowing allied parties to exist as part of a permanent coalition (such as a popular front). However, these allied parties are largely or completely subservient to the ruling party and must accept the ruling party's monopoly of power as a condition of their existence. Examples of this are the National Front in former East Germany and the Democratic Front for the Reunification of Korea in North Korea. Other states outlaw all other parties yet allow non-party members to run for legislative seats as independents, as was the case with Taiwan's Tangwai movement in the 1970s and 1980s, as well as the elections in the former Soviet Union. Still others have only a single legal party, membership of which is a prerequisite for holding public office, such as in Turkmenistan under the rule of Saparmurat Niyazov or Zaire under Mobutu Sese Seko.

Within their own countries, dominant parties ruling over one-party states are often referred to simply as the Party. For example, in reference to the Soviet Union, the Party meant the Communist Party of the Soviet Union; in reference to the pre-1991 Republic of Zambia, it referred to the United National Independence Party.

Most one-party states have been ruled by one of the following:
A party which supports the ideology of Marxism–Leninism and vanguardism (sometimes described as "communist states", such as the Soviet Union)
A party which supports a nationalist or fascist ideology (such as the Kingdom of Italy under the National Fascist Party or Germany under the Nazi Party)
A party that came to power in the wake of independence from colonial rule. One-party systems often arise from decolonization because a single party gains an overwhelmingly dominant role in liberation or in independence struggles.
With such a small winning coalition, leaders in One-Party states lack the incentive to care about the well-being of citizens.  Rather, they give out private goods to fellow elites to ensure continued support.  One-Party, compared to Dominant-party dictatorships, structure themselves unlike democracies.  They also turn into democracies at a lower rate than Dominant-party dictatorships. While One-Party states prohibit opposition parties, some allow for elections at the smallest local level.  One-Party states lack any legitimate competition therefore, they place elites and sympathetic candidates in key administrative races.  For example, The Chinese Communist Party exercises political control by infiltrating village administrations.  They view these positions as crucial for gathering information on the population and maintaining a presence in the far reaches of their borders.  One-Party states recognize the trade-off between election victory and gathering valuable data.  To account for this, the regimes have been observed placing local nobility in easy to win races.  One-Party states have also been observed using elections to ensure that only the most popular elites get chosen to office.  They also gather data from elections to indicate if a local official is performing poorly in the eyes of the residents.  This gives locals the opportunity to monitor local officials and communicate satisfaction with the local government.   Throughout the country, members of the one party hold key political positions.  In doing so, the party avoids committing outright fraud and rather sustains their power at the local level with strategic appointment of elites .  It is also worth noting that it is difficult to gather clear data on these regimes given their private nature.  

One-party states are usually considered to be authoritarian, to the extent that they are occasionally totalitarian. On the other hand, not all authoritarian or totalitarian states operate upon one-party rule. Some, especially amongst absolute monarchies and military dictatorships, have no need for a ruling party, and therefore make all political parties illegal.

Former one-party states

See also
Ban on factions in the Communist Party of the Soviet Union
Political organisation
Dominant-party system
Political factionalism
Outline of democracy
Multi-party system
Two-party system
List of political party songs

Notes

References

Authoritarianism
 
Political systems
Political party systems
Unitary state